Jonathan Ross (born 1960) is an English television and radio personality.

Jonathan or Jon Ross may also refer to:

 Jonathan Ross (senator) (1826–1905), United States Senator, Justice of the Vermont Supreme Court
 Jonny Ross, Irish bowls player
 Jonny Ross, 1960s UK singer who covered "Silent Voices"
 Jon Ross (writer), writer for television shows such as Lucky Louie
 John Rossiter (novelist) (1916–2005), British writer of detective fiction under the pseudonym Jonathan Ross
 The Jonathan Ross Show, a British chat show presented by Jonathan Ross
 Jonathan Todd Ross (born 1979), actor and writer

See also 
 Jonathon Ross (disambiguation)